San Sadurniño is a municipality in the province of A Coruña in the autonomous community of Galicia in northwestern Spain. It belongs to the comarca of Ferrol. It is located in the valley of the Rio Grande de Xuvia. Sights include the ruins of the Naraío Castle and the Palaces of the marquises of San Sadurniño.

References

External links
  Site devoted to the art of landscape and nature of Ferrolterra 

Municipalities in the Province of A Coruña
Castles in Galicia (Spain)